Duangjai "Phiao" Hirunsri (Thai: ดวงใจ หิรัญศรี) (born 1980) is a Thai actress.

Biography
Duangjai was born in 1980 and studied at Thammasat University. She is a member of the Anatta Theatre Troupe. She is best known for her appearances in the Swedish television show 30 Degrees in February and was nominated for Best Supporting Actress by the Thailand National Film Association for her role in The Blue Hour in 2015.

Filmography
2000 Mysterious Object at Noon (Thai: Dokfa Nai Meuman)
2007 Ma fille est innocente''' (TV Movie) as Mei Lin
2012 30 Degrees in February (Swedish: 30° i februari) (TV Series) (season 1) as Oh 
2014 Patong Girl as Fai's Sister Plaa 
2014 The Last Executioner as Duangjai 
2015 ThirTEEN Terrors (TV Series) 
2015 The Blue Hour (Thai: Onthakan) as Mother 
2016 30 Degrees in February (Swedish: 30° i februari) (TV Series) (season 2) as Oh
2016 Take Me Home as Chom

Dramas
2017   (Thai: ศรีอโยธยา) On Air True4U as Tao Song Kan Dan
2019   (Thai: ศรีอโยธยา 2) On Air True4U as Tao Song Kan Dan
2021 MAY-DECEMBER ROMANCE (Thai: พฤษภา-ธันวา รักแท้แค่เกิดก่อน) On Air 3HD33 as Professor.Doctor.Jurairat Leidpongsathon (Sis.Jum/Pa Minraya (Mint))
2022 From Chao Phraya to Irrawaddy (Thai: จากเจ้าพระยาสู่อิรวดี) On Air Thai PBS 3 as Princess Mongkut
2022 A Cunning Destiny (2022) (Thai: Boopae Roi Raai) On Air 3HD33 as Padcha Mather (Cameo)

Series
2019   (Thai: พรุ่งนี้จะไม่มีแม่แล้ว) On Air LINE TV as Sing Mother
2022 Thai Cave Rescue (Thai: ถ้ำหลวง: ภารกิจแห่งความหวัง) On Air 3HD33 as Tle’s Mom (Cameo)
2022 Magic Of Zero Ep. Zero In The Moonnight (Thai: เมจิกออฟซีโร ตอน Zero In The Moonnight'') On Air GMM 25 as Maki’s mather

References

External links
 IMDB: Djuangjai Hirunsri
 Facebook "Duangjai Phiao Hiransri"

1980 births
Living people
Duangjai Hirunsri
Duangjai Hirunsri
Duangjai Hirunsri
Duangjai Hirunsri
Duangjai Hirunsri
Duangjai Hirunsri
Duangjai Hirunsri